See It Through My Eyes is the reissue of American singer-songwriter Meredith Brooks' self-titled debut studio album. Originally released in 1986 as Meredith Brooks by Ariola, the album was reissued on November 11, 1997, by Bizarre Planet Entertainment. The record label intended to capitalize on Brooks' newfound success following the release of her second album, Blurring the Edges (1997).

Background
Recorded in 1984, the album was originally released as Meredith Brooks in 1986 by Ariola Records. It was released exclusively in Europe and received minimal recognition. In an effort to capitalize on Brooks' newfound success following Blurring the Edges,  Bizarre Planet Entertainment reissued the album in November 1997 under the title See It Through My Eyes.

Critical reception

See It Through My Eyes received generally unfavorable critical reception. AllMusic assigned the album a two star rating out of five. David Browne of Entertainment Weekly referred to the album as the "spandex-clad skeleton in [Brooks'] closet," further stating that the songs are "blatant rip-offs of ’80s hits."

Track listing

Personnel
Meredith Brooks – guitar, vocals
Bob Burns – drums
William Burns – bass guitar, vocals
Robert Miranda – guitar
David Perry – guitar, keyboards

Production
Producers: David Perry, Jack Robinson
Engineer: David Perry
Mastering: Herb Jung
Photography: Robert Duffey

Notes 

Meredith Brooks albums
1997 albums